Gladden Creek is a stream in Dent and Shannon counties in the Ozarks of southern Missouri. It is a tributary of the Current River.

The source area for the stream lies about six miles south of Salem and it flows southeast to south generally parallel to and west of Missouri Route 19 past Custer and Gladden. It enters Shannon County just northwest of Rector and enters the Current River at Akers.

Gladden Creek has the name of the local Gladden family.

See also
List of rivers of Missouri

References

Rivers of Dent County, Missouri
Rivers of Shannon County, Missouri
Rivers of Missouri
Tributaries of the Current River (Ozarks)